Kumbhar Falia or Kumbhar Faliya is a small village of the Navsari district, Gujarat, India.

References

Villages in Navsari district
Originally, Kumbhar Falia, as its name suggest, was known as a FALIA of nearby village, NAGDHARA. Recently, it was separated as a FALIA of Nagdhara,  and recognized as a village of Navsari Tehsil. 

Kumbhar Falia,  is also the last village, located on the border line of Naavsari and Mahuva tehsils  (Taluka).